Millennium Pictures Pty Limited is a film and media production company based in Rosewood, NSW, Australia and run by Posie Graeme-Evans and her husband.

Works
 The Miraculous Mellops (1991-2)
 Mirror, Mirror (1995)
 McLeod's Daughters (1996)
 Doom Runners (1997)

References

Film production companies of Australia
Television production companies of Australia